Polynesian is the adjectival form of Polynesia. It may refer to:

 Polynesians, an ethnic group
 Polynesian culture, the culture of the indigenous peoples of Polynesia
 Polynesian mythology, the oral traditions of the people of Polynesia
 Polynesian languages, a language family spoken in geographical Polynesia and on a patchwork of outliers

Other 
 Disney's Polynesian Village Resort
 Polynesian (horse), an American Thoroughbred racehorse and sire
 Polynesian Leaders Group, an international governmental cooperation group
 Polynesian Triangle, a region of the Pacific Ocean with three island groups at its corners
 The Polynesian, a Honolulu-based newspaper published in the mid-nineteenth century

See also
 

Language and nationality disambiguation pages